The 2022–23 Taipei Fubon Braves season will be the franchise's third season in the P. LEAGUE+ (PLG), its 9th in Taipei City. The Braves are coached by Hsu Chin-Che in his sixth year as head coach. The Braves will also participate in 2022–23 East Asia Super League as the 2022 P. League+ champions.

Draft 

The Braves acquired 2022 first-round draft pick from Kaohsiung Steelers in exchange for Wang Lu-Hsiang.

Standings

Roster

Game log

2023 EASL Champions Week

Group stage

Preseason 

|-style="background:#cfc"
| 1 || October 8 || @Steelers || W 94–88 || Tseng Hsiang-Chun (22) || Chris Johnson (11) || Lai, Singletary (5) || Fengshan Arena4,205 || 1–0
|-style="background:#cfc"
| 2 || October 9 || Kings || W 114–99 || Chris Johnson (27) || Mike Singletary (14) || Mike Singletary (6) || Fengshan Arena3,668 || 2–0

Regular season 

|-style="background:#cfc"
| 1 || November 5 || Lioneers || W 102–94 || Perry Jones (27) || Chris Johnson (13) || Johnson, Jones (3) || Taipei Heping Basketball Gymnasium7,000 || 1–0
|-style="background:#cfc"
| 2 || November 6 || Steelers || W 117–114 || Mike Singletary (42) || Mike Singletary (12) || Chris Johnson (9) || Taipei Heping Basketball Gymnasium6,530 || 2–0
|-style="background:#cfc"
| 3 || November 13 || @Dreamers || W 108–75 || Mike Singletary (25) || Chris Johnson (13) || Johnson, Lai (5) || Intercontinental Basketball Stadium3,000 || 3–0
|-style="background:#fcc"
| 4 || November 20 || @Lioneers || L 104–108 (2OT) || Chris Johnson (39) || Chris Johnson (20) || Lin Chih-Chieh (6) || Hsinchu County Stadium5,612 || 3–1
|-style="background:#fcc"
| 5 || November 25 || @Kings || L 89–104 || Chris Johnson (27) || Chris Johnson (13) || Perry Jones (5) || Xinzhuang Gymnasium4,722 || 3–2

|-style="background:#cfc"
| 6 || December 3 || @Steelers || W 125–119 || Chris Johnson (36) || Chris Johnson (11) || Chou Kuei-Yu (7) || Fengshan Arena3,306 || 4–2
|-style="background:#cfc"
| 7 || December 6 || @Dreamers || W 90–87 || Chris Johnson (23) || Mike Singletary (18) || Chris Johnson (5) || Intercontinental Basketball Stadium3,000 || 5–2
|-style="background:#fcc"
| 8 || December 10 || Kings || L 99–103 || Mike Singletary (30) || Chris Johnson (16) || Chou, Singletary (5) || Taipei Heping Basketball Gymnasium6,645 || 5–3
|-style="background:#fcc"
| 9 || December 11 || Dreamers || L 94–97 || Chris Johnson (31) || Mike Singletary (13) || Mike Singletary (9) || Taipei Heping Basketball Gymnasium6,138 || 5–4
|-style="background:#cfc"
| 10 || December 17 || Steelers || W 114–80 || Chris Johnson (27) || Chris Johnson (14) || Mike Singletary (8) || Taipei Heping Basketball Gymnasium5,208 || 6–4
|-style="background:#cfc"
| 11 || December 18 || Lioneers || W 114–98 || Mike Singletary (32) || Chris Johnson (18) || Chou Kuei-Yu (8) || Taipei Heping Basketball Gymnasium5,568 || 7–4
|-style="background:#fcc"
| 12 || December 23 || Kings || L 101–106 || Chris Johnson (23) || Chris Johnson (11) || Mike Singletary (6) || Taipei Heping Basketball Gymnasium6,015 || 7–5
|-style="background:#fcc"
| 13 || December 25 || @Pilots || L 85–90 || Tseng Hsiang-Chun (26) || Mike Singletary (16) || Mike Singletary (6) || Taoyuan Arena3,659 || 7–6

|-style="background:#fcc"
| 14 || January 1 || @Kings || L 83–95 || Mike Singletary (27) || Mike Singletary (11) || Jones, Singletary (5) || Xinzhuang Gymnasium6,540 || 7–7
|-style="background:#fcc"
| 15 || January 8 || @Lioneers || L 92–94 || Mike Singletary (24) || Chris Johnson (20) || Chris Johnson (7) || Hsinchu County Stadium5,389 || 7–8
|-style="background:#ccc"
| PPD || January 14 || @Steelers || colspan = 6 style="text-align:center"|Postponed
|-style="background:#cfc"
| 16 || January 28 || Pilots || W 86–74 || Ihor Zaytsev (23) || Mike Singletary (13) || Ihor Zaytsev (3) || Taipei Heping Basketball Gymnasium7,000 || 8–8
|-style="background:#cfc"
| 17 || January 29 || Steelers || W 106–82 || Johnson, Singletary (22) || Chris Johnson (18) || Chris Johnson (6) || Taipei Heping Basketball Gymnasium5,240 || 9–8

|-style="background:#cfc"
| 18 || February 4 || New Taipei Kings || W 111–109 || Mike Singletary (21) || Tseng Hsiang-Chun (9) || Lai Ting-En (7) || Taipei Heping Basketball Gymnasium6,525 || 10–8
|-style="background:#cfc"
| 19 || February 5 || Formosa Taishin Dreamers || W 90–75 || Chris Johnson (21) || Chris Johnson (28) || Lu Zong-Lin (6) || Taipei Heping Basketball Gymnasium5,604 || 11–8
|-style="background:#cfc"
| 20 || February 11 || @Taoyuan Pauian Pilots || W 80–78 || Lin Chih-Chieh (18) || Chris Johnson (18) || Johnson, Lin C., Tsai (4) || Taoyuan Arena3,986 || 12–8
|-style="background:#cfc"
| 21 || February 19 || Taoyuan Pauian Pilots || W 86–84 || Mike Singletary (18) || Mike Singletary (8) || Mike Singletary (8) || Taipei Heping Basketball Gymnasium6,048 || 13–8
|-style="background:#cfc"
| 22 || February 21 || Hsinchu JKO Lioneers || W 131–101 || Chris Johnson (36) || Chris Johnson (17) || Chang T., Singletary (7) || Taipei Heping Basketball Gymnasium4,965 || 14–8
|-style="background:#cfc"
| 23 || February 24 || Formosa Taishin Dreamers || W 91–87 || Lin Chih-Chieh (21) || Johnson, Zaytsev (11) || Chang T., Chou, Hung, Lin C. (3) || Taipei Heping Basketball Gymnasium5,126 || 15–8
|-style="background:#fcc"
| 24 || February 26 || @Pilots || L 80–83 || Mike Singletary (23) || Singletary, Zaytsev (12) || Mike Singletary (8) || Taoyuan Arena3,857 || 15–9

|-style="background:#fcc"
| 25 || March 10 || @Steelers || L 102–103 || Mike Singletary (25) || Mike Singletary (13) || Lin Chih-Chieh (5) || Fengshan Arena5,321 || 15–10
|-style="background:#cfc"
| 26 || March 12 || @Kings || W 106–95 || Mike Singletary (38) || Mike Singletary (15) || Chang T., Lai, Lin C. (4) || Xinzhuang Gymnasium4,257 || 16–10
|-style="background:#fcc"
| 27 || March 18 || Kings || L 90–97 || Mike Singletary (25) || Mike Singletary (12) || Lin Chih-Chieh (6) || Taipei Heping Basketball Gymnasium6,862 || 16–11
|-style="background:#cfc"
| 28 || March 19 || Lioneers || W 112–99 || Ihor Zaytsev (26) || Chris Johnson (10) || Tsai Wen-Cheng (5) || Taipei Heping Basketball Gymnasium6,088 || 17–11
|-
| 29 || March 25 || @Steelers ||  ||  ||  ||  || Fengshan Arena || 

|-
| 30 || April 1 || @Dreamers ||  ||  ||  ||  || Intercontinental Basketball Stadium || 
|-
| 31 || April 4 || @Pilots ||  ||  ||  ||  || Taoyuan Arena || 
|-
| 32 || April 9 || @Steelers ||  ||  ||  ||  || Fengshan Arena || 
|-
| 33 || April 15 || @Kings ||  ||  ||  ||  || Xinzhuang Gymnasium || 
|-
| 34 || April 22 || Dreamers ||  ||  ||  ||  || Taipei Heping Basketball Gymnasium || 
|-
| 35 || April 23 || Pilots ||  ||  ||  ||  || Taipei Heping Basketball Gymnasium || 
|-
| 36 || April 29 || @Dreamers ||  ||  ||  ||  || Intercontinental Basketball Stadium || 

|-
| 37 || May 1 || @Lioneers ||  ||  ||  ||  || Hsinchu County Stadium || 
|-
| 38 || May 6 || Steelers ||  ||  ||  ||  || Taipei Heping Basketball Gymnasium || 
|-
| 39 || May 7 || Pilots ||  ||  ||  ||  || Taipei Heping Basketball Gymnasium || 
|-
| 40 || May 14 || @Lioneers ||  ||  ||  ||  || Hsinchu County Stadium ||

Player Statistics 
<noinclude>

Regular season

Transactions

Trades

Free Agency

Re-signed

Additions

Subtractions

Awards

Players of the Week

References 

Taipei Fubon Braves seasons
Taipei Fubon Braves